Copper Mountain is the highest mountain in the Copper Mountains of northern Elko County, Nevada, United States. It is located within the Mountain City Ranger District of the Humboldt-Toiyabe National Forest.

Summit panorama

References

External links 

 

Mountains of Elko County, Nevada
Mountains of Nevada
Humboldt–Toiyabe National Forest